The Isle of Wight is an island and ceremonial county in England.

Isle of Wight may also refer to:

Places

England
Isle of Wight (UK Parliament constituency)
Isle of Wight, a group of dwellings within Bookham Commons, Surrey
Isle of Wight Council, which covers a unitary authority region 
Isle of Wight Rural District, a rural district from 1894 to 1974

United States
Isle of Wight (Maryland)
Isle of Wight, the original name of Gardiners Island, New York
Isle of Wight County, Virginia
Isle of Wight, Virginia, an unincorporated community

Other uses
 Isle of Wight (album), a 1971 Jimi Hendrix album
 Isle of Wight Festival, an annual music festival on the main Isle of Wight, in England

See also
IOW (disambiguation)